The PADC Defiant was a trainer and light attack aircraft that was developed by the Philippine Aerospace Development Corporation to reduce dependence on second-hand aircraft for the Philippine Air Force.

Development
In 1981 Gold Wings Aviation, a private company under Capt. Panfilo Villaruel Jr. (who later became chief of the Air Transportation Office (ATO) and president of the Philippine Aerospace Development Corporation (PADC)), conceived an aircraft research and development undertaking called the Norlindo program, named after one of its first engineers. The program covered a progressive development of a high-performance trainer primarily intended for use by the Philippine Air Force (PAF). The program was launched as an innovative step to build an aircraft of local design and utilizing indigenous materials. Gold Wings initiated preliminary design of a twin-engine turboprop named Norlindo and even began conceptual design of a turbojet trainer called Tinihaban Superstrike under the All-Filipino Technology Aircraft (AFTA) project. Out of these experiences, a single, piston engine trainer aircraft was conceived, designed, built and flown within three years.

The Defiant 300 prototype, as the aircraft was called, flew twice, the first on February 22, 1988. The Defiant project came out to be an excellent collaborative effort of a group of aeronautical engineers, aviation enthusiasts, government agencies and research institutions.

Based on the successful flights of the prototype, Gold Wings planned to build another prototype of a modified Defiant (appropriately named Defiant 500) with an all-metal airframe and power rating increased to 500 hp. Due to lack of financial support from the government, the plan did not push through, including another design of a light aircraft called Pegasus, which was presented to the Philippine Army as a contender for the proposed Philippine Army aviation arm.

Design
The two-seat tandem Defiant prototype (registered as RP-X239) was an exceptional technical arrangement of various systems and parts taken from different types of aircraft in the PAF inventory. The landing gears, flight controls and flaps motor were taken from the Beechcraft T-34 Mentor, seats from the Cessna U-17B, rudder and brake pedals from the Boeing-Stearman PT-13 and various instrument items from the Britten-Norman BN-2 Islander, T-34 Mentor, Sikorsky S-76 and SIAI-Marchetti SF.260. The Defiant was powered by a single Lycoming IO-540-K1B5 piston engine on loan from the PADC, the same engine that powers the BN-2 Islander. The prototype had the highest engine power rating of all the prototypes of local design flown so far.

Noteworthy were several original features designed and fabricated by the engines with technical support from several persons and companies. The airframe was fabricated from palosapis wood and the skin from tanguile veneer plywood. The engine mount was fabricated from chrome molybdenum steel. Most significant of all was the fabrication and assembly of a one-piece plastic canopy. Fuel tanks were constructed with 5052-H34 aluminum alloys. Instrument panel, electrical, hydraulic and pitot-static systems were laid out with the help of reference books and articles.

Variants
Defiant 300The first prototype, powered by a single Lycoming IO-540-K1B5 piston engine, which had its maiden flight on February 22, 1988.
Defiant 500The second prototype, with an all-metal airframe and a 500 hp engine, was not finished due to lack of financial support from the government.

Operators

 Philippine Air Force

Aircraft on display
 The Defiant 300 is currently on display in a hangar at the Philippine State College of Aeronautics.

Specifications (Defiant 300)

See also

References

Aircraft manufactured in the Philippines